The 7th Annual Latin Grammy Awards were held for the first time in New York City, NY. The awards show was held at Madison Square Garden on Thursday, November 2, 2006. Shakira was the big winner winning Album of the Year, one of four awards that she won. She is the first female artist to win Record of the Year, Album of the Year, and Song of the Year.

Awards
Winners are in bold text.

General
Record of the Year

Shakira featuring Alejandro Sanz — "La Tortura"
Ricardo Arjona — "Acompáñame A Estar Solo"
Fonseca — "Te Mando Flores"
Sérgio Mendes featuring The Black Eyed Peas — "Mas Que Nada"
Julieta Venegas — "Me Voy"

Album of the Year

Shakira — Fijación Oral Vol. 1
Gustavo Cerati — Ahí vamos
Chayanne — Cautivo
León Gieco — Por Favor, Perdón y Gracias
Julieta Venegas — Limón y Sal

Song of the Year

Luis F. Ochoa and Shakira — "La Tortura" (Shakira featuring Alejandro Sanz)
Ricardo Arjona — "Acompáñame A Estar Solo"
Pablo Manavello and Ricardo Montaner — "Cuando A Mi Lado Estas" (Ricardo Montaner)
Amaury Gutiérrez — "Nada Es Para Siempre" (Luis Fonsi)
Lena — "Tu Corazón" (Lena featuring Alejandro Sanz)

Best New Artist

Calle 13
Céu
Inés Gaviria
Lena
Pamela Rodríguez

Pop
Best Female Pop Vocal Album

Shakira — Fijación Oral Vol. 1
Anaís — Así Soy Yo
Inés Gaviria — A Mi Manera
Niña Pastori — Joyas Prestadas
Rosario — Contigo Me Voy
Thalía — El Sexto Sentido: Re+Loaded

Best Male Pop Vocal Album

Ricardo Arjona — Adentro
Andrea Bocelli — Amor
Chayanne — Cautivo
Luis Fonsi — Paso a Paso
Ricardo Montaner — Todo y Nada

Best Pop Album by a Duo/Group with Vocals

La Oreja de Van Gogh — Guapa
Belanova — Dulce Beat
La 5ª Estación — Acústico
RBD — Nuestro Amor
Servando y Florentino — Servando y Florentino
Sin Bandera — Mañana

Urban
Best Urban Music Album

Calle 13 — Calle 13
Daddy Yankee — Barrio Fino En Directo
Don Omar — King of Kings
Wisin & Yandel — Pa'l Mundo

Rock
Best Rock Solo Vocal Album

Gustavo Cerati — Ahí Vamos
Belen Arjona — Infinito
Fabiana Cantilo — Inconsciente Colectivo
Alejandra Guzmán — Indeleble
Ariel Rot — Ahora Piden Tu Cabeza

Best Rock Album by a Duo/Group with Vocals

Natalia y La Forquetina — Casa
Black Guayaba — Lo Demas es Plastico
Motel — Motel
Polbo — Polbo
Rata Blanca — La Llave de la Puerta Secreta

Best Alternative Music Album

Julieta Venegas — Limón y Sal
Babasónicos — Anoche
Café Tacuba — Un Viaje
Nortec Collective — Tijuana Sessions Vol. 3
Pastora — La Vida Moderna

Best Rock Song

Gustavo Cerati — "Crimen"
Chetes — "Completamente"
Rodrigo Dávila — "Dime Ven" (Motel)
Jorge Pardo — "Un Dia No Vuelvo A Empezar"
Mario Domm and Alejandra Guzmán — "Volverte a Amar" (Alejandra Guzmán)

Tropical
Best Salsa Album

Gilberto Santa Rosa — Directo Al Corazón
La India — Soy Diferente
Víctor Manuelle — Decisión Unánime
Tito Nieves — Hoy, Mañana y Siempre
Gilberto Santa Rosa and El Gran Combo de Puerto Rico — Asi Es Nuestra Navidad

Best Merengue Album

Milly Quezada — MQ
Grupo Mania — La Hora de la Verdad
Eddy Herrera — Amor de Locos
Limi-T 21 — Rankeao
Johnny Ventura — 103 Boulevard

Best Cumbia/Vallenato Album

Los Hermanos Zuleta — Cien Días de Bohemia
Alfa 8 — Yo Bailo Cumbia
Binomio de Oro de América — Grafiti de Amor
Jorge Celedón and Jimmy Zambrano — Grandes Exitos En Vivo
Iván Ovalle — Veinte Años Después...

Best Contemporary Tropical Album

Olga Tañón — Una Nueva Mujer
Cabas — Puro Cabas
Ciclón — Ciclón
Fonseca — Corazón
Chichi Peralta — Más Que Suficiente

Best Traditional Tropical Album

Andy Montañez and Pablo Milanés — AM/PM Líneas Paralelas
Chucho Avellanet — Esta Noche Está Para Boleros
Juan de Marcos and the Afro-Cuban All Stars — Step Forward - The Next Generation
Compay Segundo — Siempre Compay
Melina León and Los Tri-O — Serenata En San Juan
Plena Libre — Evolución

Best Tropical Song

Fonseca — "Te Mando Flores"
Víctor Manuelle — "Dos Soneros, Una Historia" (Gilberto Santa Rosa and Víctor Manuelle)
Yoel Henríquez and Jorge Luis Piloto — "Esa Boquita" (Tito Nieves)
Víctor Manuelle — "I Love Salsa!" (N'Klabe)
Cabas and Kike Santander — "La Cadena de Oro" (Cabas)

Singer-Songwriter
Best Singer-Songwriter Album

Pablo Milanés — Como un Campo de Maíz
Chico Buarque — Carioca
León Gieco — Por Favor, Perdón y Gracias
Ivan Lins — Acariocando
Joaquín Sabina — Alivio de Luto

Regional Mexican
Best Ranchero Album

Pepe Aguilar — Historias de Mi Tierra
Ana Gabriel — Dos amores un amante
Pablo Montero — A Toda Ley
Lupillo Rivera — El Rey de las Cantinas
Alicia Villarreal — Orgullo de Mujer

Best Banda Album

Joan Sebastian — Más Allá Del Sol
Banda el Recodo — Hay Amor
Graciela Beltrán — Rancherísimas Con Banda
El Coyote y Su Banda Tierra Santa — Prohibido
Los Horóscopos de Durango — Antes Muertas Que Sencillas

Best Grupero Album

Joan Sebastian — En El Auditorio Nacional
Ana Bárbara — No Es Brujería
Grupo Bronco — Por Ti
Grupo Bryndis — Por Muchas Razones Te Quiero
Guardianes del Amor — Decórame El Corazón

Best Tejano Album

La Mafia — Nuevamente
Jimmy González & El Grupo Mazz — Mejor Que Nunca
Las 3 Divas — Las 3 Divas
Little Joe & La Familia — Chicanisimo
Joe Posada — Amor y Fuego

Best Norteño Album

Los Tigres del Norte — Historias Que Contar
Ramón Ayala y Sus Bravos Del Norte — Ya No Llores
Palomo — Pasión
Pesado — Tu Sombra
Michael Salgado — Volver Volver

Best Tropical Regional Mexican Album

A.B. Quintanilla III & Los Kumbia Kings — Kumbia Kings Live
DJ Kane — Capitulo II: Brinca
Los Acosta — Amor y Delirio
Los Ángeles de Charly — Cuando Te Enamoras
Los Angeles Azules — Interpretan Éxitos de Juan Gabriel
Tropical Panama — 13 Cumbias Revolucionadas

Best Regional Mexican Song

Edgar Cortazar, Ernesto Cortazar and Tony Melendez — "Aun Sigues Siendo Mia" (Conjunto Primavera)
Mauricio L. Arriaga and J. E. Murgia — "Contra Viento y Marea" (Intocable)
Freddie Martínez, Sr. — "Corazón De Fierro" (Jimmy González & El Grupo Mazz)
Joan Sebastian — "Más Allá del Sol" 
Ana Gabriel — "Sin Tu Amor"

Instrumental
Best Instrumental Album

Bebo Valdés — Bebo
Banda Mantiqueira — Terra Amantiquira
Paquito D'Rivera — The Jazz Chamber Trio
Luis Salinas — Luis Salinas y Amigos En España
Mario Adnet & Zé Nogueira — Moacir Santos: Choros y Alegría

Traditional
Best Folk Album

Mercedes Sosa — Corazón Libre
Quique Domenech and Alejandro Croatto — Con El Corazón...
Grupo Renacer — Puerto Rico Te Saluda...
Chango Spasiuk — Tarefero de Mis Pagos
Cacho Tirao — La Guitarra Argentina
Yoruba Andabo — Rumba En La Habana Con...

Best Tango Album

Various Artists — Café de Los Maestros
Gerardo Gandini — Flores Negras Postangos En Vivo en Rosario Vol. II
María Estela Monti — Ciudad Secreta
Lalo Schifrin — Letters from Argentina

Best Flamenco Album

Diego El Cigala — Picasso En Mis Ojos
Vicente Amigo — Un Momento En El Sonido
Javier Limón — Limón
Morente — Sueña La Alhambra
Estrella Morente — Mujeres

Jazz
Best Latin Jazz Album

Gonzalo Rubalcaba — Solo
Ed Motta — Aystelum
Eddie Palmieri — Listen Here!
Jovino Santos Neto — Roda Carioca
Dave Valentin — World on a String

Christian
Best Christian Album (Spanish language)

Marcos Witt — Dios es Bueno
Aline Barros — Aline
Daniel Calveti — Vivo Para Ti
Jesus Adrian Romero — El Aire de tu Casa

Best Christian Album (Portuguese language)

Aline Barros — Aline Barros y Cia
Mara Maravilha — Jóia Rara
Cristina Mel — As Canções da Minha Vida 15 Anos - Ao Vivo
Soraya Moraes — Promessas
Robson Nascimento — Tudo O Que Soul

Brazilian
Best Brazilian Contemporary Pop Album

Sérgio Mendes — Timeless
Jota Quest — Até Onde Vai
Los Hermanos — 4
Margareth Menezes — Pra Você
Marisa Monte — Infinito Particular
Sandy & Junior — Sandy & Junior (2006)
Ivete Sangalo — As Super Novas

Best Brazilian Rock Album

Os Paralamas do Sucesso — Hoje
Barão Vermelho — MTV ao Vivo
Charlie Brown Jr. — Imunidade Musical
O Rappa — Acústico MTV
Nando Reis — Sim e Não

Best Samba/Pagode Album

Marisa Monte — Universo ao Meu Redor
Alcione — Uma Nova Paixão ao Vivo
Martinho da Vila — Brasilatinidade ao Vivo
Demônios da Garoa — Ao Vivo
Jair Rodrigues — Alma Negra

Best MPB Album

Maria Rita — Segundo
João Bosco — Obrigado, Gente!
Ana Carolina and Seu Jorge — Ana e Jorge ao Vivo
Gal Costa — Hoje
Jane Duboc — Uma Voz... Uma Paixão
Simone — Simone - Ao Vivo

Best Romantic Music Album

Roberto Carlos — Roberto Carlos
Alaíde Costa — Tudo Que o Tempo Me Deixou
Daniel — Amor Absoluto
Leonardo — De Corpo e Alma
Tânia Mara — Louca Paixão

Best Brazilian Roots/Regional Album

Chitãozinho & Xororó — Vida Marvada
Frank Aguilar — Sou Brasileiro
Banda Calypso — Volume 8
Caju & Castanha — Levante a Taça
Sérgio Reis — Para Toda a Família

Best Brazilian Song

Rodrigo Maranhão — "Caminho das Águas" (Maria Rita)
Gigi — "Abalou" (Ivete Sangalo)
Gilberto Gil — "Balé de Berlim"
Arnaldo Antunes, Carlinhos Brown and Marisa Monte — "O Bonde do Dom" (Marisa Monte)
Chico Buarque — "Ela Faz Cinema"

Children's
Best Latin Children's Album

Adriana Partimpim — Adriana Partimpim - O Show
Griselle Bou, Victor Meléndez and Annette Bou — Canciones y Cantos-Juegos Infantiles del Folklore Puertorriqueño
Tatiana — El Regalo 2
Xuxa — Só Para Baixinhos 6

Classical
Best Classical Album

Michel Camilo and Ernest Martínez Izquierdo — Rhapsody In Blue
Jeff Von Der Schmidt — Carlos Chávez: Complete Chamber Music Volume 3
Manuel Barrueco and Victor Pablo Pérez — Concierto Barroco
Edson Cordeiro — Contratenor
Eduardo Marturet conducting the Berliner Symphoniker — Encantamento
Mauro Senise and Jota Moraes — Tempo Caboclo

Recording Package
Best Recording Package

Laura Varsky — Café de Los Maestros (Various Artist)
Alexandra Lahr — Live In Los Angeles (Los Pinguos)
Omar Delgado — Productos Desaparecidos (La Pestilencia)
Marcelo Kertész — Samba Passarinho (Péri)
Fritz Torres and Jorge Verdin — Tijuana Sessions Vol. 3 (Nortec Collective)
Edward Martínez — Timeless (Sérgio Mendes)

Production
Best Engineered Album

Gustavo Celis, Serban Ghenea, Mauricio Guerrero, Rob Jacobs, Kevin Killen, Dave Way and Vlado Meller — Fijación Oral Vol. 1 (Shakira)
Valerio Calisse, Hernan Gatica, Humberto Gatica, Pierpaolo Guerrini, Alejandro Rodríguez, Jochen Van Der Saag and Vlado Meller — Amore (Andrea Bocelli)
Cotô Guarino, Swami Junior, André "K-belo" Sangiácomo and Carlos Freitas — De Uns Tempos Pra Cá (Chico César)
Duda Mello and Carlos Freitas — Jet - Samba (Marcos Valle)
José Luis Crespo, Sancho Gómez Escobar, Joaquín Pizarro and Jesús N. Gómez — La Vida Moderna (Pastora)

Producer of the Year

Cachorro López
Cesar Camargo Mariano
Moogie Canazio
Lenine and Maria Rita
Gustavo Santaolalla

Music Video
Best Short Form Music Video

Calle 13 — "Atrévete-te-te" 
Ricardo Arjona — "Mojado"
Chayanne — "Te Echo de Menos"
Shakira featuring Alejandro Sanz — "La Tortura"
Julieta Venegas — "Me Voy"

Best Long Form Music Video

Bebo Valdés and Diego El Cigala — Blanco y Negro En Vivo
Café Tacuba — Un Viaje
Daniela Mercury — Baile Barroco
O Rappa — Acústico MTV
Simone — Simone - Ao Vivo

Special awards
Lifetime Achievement Awards
 Graciela
 Paloma San Basilio
 León Gieco
 César Camargo Mariano
 Richie Ray & Bobby Cruz
 Alberto Vázquez
 Johnny Ventura

Trustees Awards
 Alejandro Quintero
 Rafael Escalona

Performers
 Shakira featuring Alejandro Sanz — "La Pared / La Tortura"
 Ana Gabriel — "Siete Veces, Siete Más"
 Andrea Bocelli — "Bésame Mucho"
 Thalía — "Seducción"
 Maná featuring Juan Luis Guerra — "Labios Compartidos / Bendita tu luz / Oye Mi Amor"
 Luis Fonsi and Billy Gibbons — "Nada Es Para Siempre"
 Wisin & Yandel — "Pam Pam"
 Héctor el Father, Tonny Tun Tun, Ivy Queen and Wisin & Yandel — "Noche de Entierro (Nuestro Amor)"
 Ricky Martin featuring La Mari and Tommy Torres — "Tu Recuerdo / Pégate"
 Joan Sebastian — "Eso y Más / Más Allá del Sol"
 Juan Luis Guerra 440 — "Las Avispas"
 RBD — "Tras de Mí"
 Special salsa tribute performance by Willie Colón, Fania All-Stars, Anaís, Andy Montañez, Tito Nieves and Gilberto Santa Rosa — "Quimbara / Idilio / El Cantante / La Conciencia / Un Verano en Nueva York / Mi Gente"

Presenters
 Fonseca — presented Best Salsa Album
 Catalina Sandino Moreno and John Leguizamo — presented Best Short Form Music Video
 Calle 13 and Rosario — presented Best Pop Vocal Album, Duo or Group
 Adamari López — presented Song of the Year
 Sin Bandera — presented Best New Artist
 Galilea Montijo and Banda el Recodo — presented Best Tropical Song
 Miguel Bosé — presented People of the Year
 Gilberto Santa Rosa and Andy Montañez — presented Best Urban Music Album
 Marc Anthony — presented Record of the Year
 Paloma San Basilio and Paz Vega — presented Album of the Year
 Ricardo Montaner
 Jimmy Smits
 Olga Tañón
 Sofía Vergara
 Alejandra Barros
  Alexa Damian
 Los Horóscopos de Durango
 Lena
 Pablo Montero
 Ludwika Paleta
 Milly Quezada
 Johnny Ventura
 Anaís
 Alejandra Guzmán
 Los Tigres del Norte

References

External links
 7th Annual Latin Grammy Awards
 SIN VUELTAS "La Musica Anticipada"
 Nominations
 Univision 

Latin Grammy Awards by year
Latin Grammy Awards
Grammy Awards
Annual Latin Grammy Awards
Annual Latin Grammy Awards